Drake Sather (May 24, 1959 – March 3, 2004) was an American stand-up comedian, an Emmy nominated television writer, and a producer, actor, and director. His credits include the film Zoolander (2001), and the TV series Dennis Miller Show, Ed, Gary & Mike, Mr. Ed, The Larry Sanders Show, NewsRadio, Sammy, and Saturday Night Live.

Early life

Sather was born in Seattle, Washington, on May 24, 1959.

Career
In 1994, Sather was nominated for an Emmy Award for his work on The Larry Sanders Show. Sather wrote for Saturday Night Live during the 1994–1995 season. His last credit was an unsold pilot of a television remake of Mr. Ed, for which he also served as an executive producer.

Sather came up with the character Derek Zoolander.

Personal life
Sather was married to Krystal Ginger Hendricks from 1989–1990. He and Krystal had one child, Rudy. On July 4, 1991, he married Marnie Stroud. They remained married until his death in 2004. He and Marnie had three children: Dallas, Tristan, and Molly.

Sather died on March 3, 2004, via gunshot wound to the head, in what was ruled a suicide.

References

External links

 
 
 
 

American stand-up comedians
1959 births
2004 suicides
American male screenwriters
American television writers
Writers from Seattle
Suicides by firearm in California
Burials at Forest Lawn Memorial Park (Glendale)
American male television writers
20th-century American comedians
Comedians from Washington (state)
20th-century American male writers
20th-century American screenwriters